Reta Jo Lewis (born September 22, 1953) is an American attorney, former diplomat, and politician who is the president and chair of the Export–Import Bank of the United States.

Lewis was formerly the director of congressional affairs at the German Marshall Fund to the United States. She has also previously served as the special representative for global intergovernmental affairs at the United States Department of State during the Obama administration and special assistant to the president for political affairs during the Clinton administration.

Early life and education 
Lewis was born in Statesboro, Georgia. She earned a bachelor of arts degree from the University of Georgia, a master of arts from American University, and a juris doctor from the Emory University School of Law. She is a member in good standing of the District of Columbia and Georgia bars.

Career

Lewis joined the German Marshall Fund's Transatlantic Leadership Initiative as a Senior Fellow in January 2015. She also became the Director of the GMF's Congressional Affairs Program in April 2016. In this role, Lewis engages with Congress on behalf of the GMF, and arranges briefings and testimony on Capitol Hill with GMF experts on Transatlantic issues.

Since she began at the GMF, Lewis has been very active in engaging Congress through its Transatlantic Congressional Staff Salon Series, briefings on Capitol Hill, study tours, testimony from GMF experts, and engagement with European parliamentarians. Lewis has also worked with TLI to establish the Transatlantic Subnational Diplomacy Initiative (TSDI) to foster diplomatic relations in state and local governments. Additionally, she leads GMF's signature Congress-Bundestag parliamentarian exchanges and the Technology Transatlantic Congressional Study Tour, which focuses on global digital and privacy issues.

Global engagement

Previously, she served as the special representative for global intergovernmental affairs in the United States Department of State. In this post, Lewis stimulated the formation of relations between the U.S. Department of State, domestic subnational leaders, and their international counterparts. As special representative, she was key in facilitating the historic agreements to enhance subnational government collaboration with BRICS (Brazil, Russia, India, China, and South Africa) countries and with certain EU countries. In her role, she led the international efforts of U.S. state and local governments' cooperation towards and strategy regarding climate change to RIO+20, COP-16, COP-17 and COP-18. As part of Secretary Hillary Clinton's 21st Century Statecraft, Lewis' office was responsible for serving the global needs of U.S. intergovernmental officials and the entities they represent. Lewis was tasked to build and enhance relationships between state and local officials in the U.S. and their foreign counterparts around the world.

Lewis has also served as a partner at an international law firm and as an attorney-advisor. In this position, she represented the City and County of Denver and Mayor Wellington Webb on international issues. She served as the city's principal liaison to the U.S. government of Denver's hosting of the 1997 G-8 Summit and Summit of African Leaders that preceded the G-8. While an associate at a prestigious law firm, she served as the national tour director for the Nelson Mandela eight-city American tour, where she provided counsel and advice to Mandela and senior officials.

Domestic engagement

Under Washington D.C. Mayor Sharon Pratt Kelly, Lewis worked serving as chief of staff to the District of Columbia Department of Public Works. Additionally, Lewis served in the White House Office from 1993 to 1995. As special assistant to the president for political affairs, she was the senior domestic political advisor for the Summit of the Americas held in Miami, Florida. She was the principal staff coordinator for the White House Task Forces on the 1996 Atlanta Olympic, Paralympics Games and the 1994 FIFA World Cup of Soccer.

After working in the Clinton Administration, Lewis served as the vice president and counselor to the president at the United States Chamber of Commerce. In addition, she was appointed Director of the Chamber's effort focused on small business and outreach to women and minority-owned businesses. She was the first African American woman to be an officer, at the world's largest business organization, where she led efforts on policies and initiatives focused on women, minorities and small business owners, entrepreneurs and organizations.

Lewis has a diverse history working with law firms in varying capacities. From 1996 to 1997, she worked of counsel to Arter & Hadden, where she specialized in working with governors, mayors, legislators, and county executives. From 1997 to 2000, Lewis was a shareholder at Greenberg Traurig, LLP, where she was a member of the Government Affairs and Public Finance practice groups. She was managing director at Vanderbilt Consulting, LLC, a D.C. firm focused on government relations and business consulting, from 2005 to 2007. From 2007 to 2009, Lewis held a position of counsel at Edwards Angell Palmer & Dodge, LLP where she provided strategic corporate legal and consulting services to firm clients seeking to develop opportunities in emerging markets in Asia, Africa and Latin America. Lewis worked with multilateral organizations, firm entrepreneurs, and business owners on a wide array of industries that included investments in infrastructure, financial and energy projects.

Lewis has been engaged in domestic U.S. political campaigns. Lewis was a member of the National Finance Committee for Hillary Clinton's 2008 presidential campaign, a role she held again in the 2016 presidential election cycle. She was a pledged delegate for Hillary Clinton from the District of Columbia during the 2016 Democratic National Convention in Philadelphia. She is a past member of a DNC platform standing committee and currently is an elected D.C. Democratic State Committee At-Large Committeewoman.

Prior to her position at the State Department in 2010, Lewis was the Director of Business Outreach for the Obama-Biden Transition Project, and forged relationships between the incoming administration, business leaders, and national business associations. She also served as chair of the District of Columbia Commission for Women, where she launched the commission's economic and international committees. In addition, Lewis is a member of the International Women's Forum.

2014 Washington D.C. mayoral election

Lewis announced her candidacy for mayor of the District of Columbia on July 2, 2013. She struggled to connect with voters and did not poll above the single digits.

The Sunlight Foundation, a government transparency advocacy organization, noted that Lewis tweeted and later deleted a message that said "Reta Lewis may not be a strong candidate, but today I've learned that she's a great babysitter."

Nomination to Export-Import Bank
On September 13, 2021, President Joe Biden nominated Lewis to be the next director of the Export-Import Bank of the United States. The Senate's Banking Committee held hearings on her nomination on October 26, 2021. The committee favorably reported Lewis' nomination to the entire Senate floor on November 3, 2021. The nomination ultimately stalled in the Senate and was returned to President Biden on January 3, 2022.

President Biden resent the nomination the following day on January 4, 2022. On January 19, 2022, the committee favorably reported Lewis' nomination to the Senate floor. The entire Senate confirmed Lewis to be the next director of the bank on February 9, 2022, by a vote of 56–40. She assumed office on February 16, 2022.

Electoral history

2014

Awards and recognition
Reta Jo Lewis was named in the Women's Foreign Policy Group's list of African-American Women Trailblazers in Foreign Policy for her contributions to global affairs. In 2013, she was recognized for her work as special representative and granted the Secretary's Distinguished Service Award. She is currently a member of the U.S. Council on Foreign Relations and serves as a Steering Committee member on the Leadership Council for Women in National Security.

References 

1952 births
Living people
21st-century American women
American diplomats
American women diplomats
American women lawyers
American University alumni
Georgia (U.S. state) Democrats
University of Georgia alumni
Export–Import Bank of the United States people